Ahmed Abdallah Wayel (Arabic: احمد عبد اللّه واييل) was Minister of Education of Somalia.

References

Government ministers of Somalia
Year of birth missing (living people)
Living people